Cinta di dalam Perjodohan is an Indonesian television series that premiered on 15 November 2021 to 16 January 2022 on ANTV. The series is produced by Verona Pictures and stars Angelica Simperler, Bryan Andrew and Rendy Septino.

Plot 
Gio and Nayla, who do not know each other are in an arranged marriage by their parents. But a tragedy makes their parents die. Gio and Nayla must meet and take care of each other according to their parents' last mandate and uncover the mystery of their patents death.

Cast

Main
Angelica Simperler as Nayla Aryaseta: Fatir and Sarah's daughter; Gio's ex-wife; Azka's wife. (2021–2022)
Bryan Andrew as Gerald Abimanyu: Adriyanto and Tamara's son; Nayla's ex-husband. (2021–2022)
Rendy Septino as Azka: Hendra's adopted son; Nayla's husband. (2021–2022)

Recurring
Tamee Irelly as Wilona (2021–2022)
Tiwi Pratiwi as Prita (2021–2022)
Ali Seggaf as Miko (2021–2022)
Kea Macleod as Chris (2021–2022)
Jennifer Fonnesbech Tvermoes as Kikan (2021–2022)
Kaemita Boediono as Tamara Abimanyu: Adriyanto's wife; Gio's mother. (2021–2022)
Pierre Gruno as Hendra: Azka's adopted Father. (2021–2022)
Zora Vidyanata as Renata (2021–2022)
Neezha Rais as Tere (2021–2022)
Alfian Phang as Edwin (2021–2022)
Jerio Jeffry as Fatir: Sarah's ex-husband; Nayla's father. (2021–2022)
Dicky Andryanto as Jimmy (2021–2022)
Jacob Kai as Devan (2021–2022)
Friska Venesia as Sarah Aryaseta: Fatir's ex-wife; Nayla's mother. (dead) (2021)
Daniel Leo as Adriyanto Abimanyu: Tamara's husband; Gio's father. (dead) (2021)

Productions

Development and premiere 
The first promo of this soap opera was released on 4 November 2021. This series premiered on 15 November 2022.

Casting 
Angelica Simperler was selected to play Nayla Aryaseta. Bryan Andrew was chosen to play Gerald Abimanyu. and Rendy Septino was selected to portray the role of Azka.

References 

Indonesian drama television series
Indonesian television soap operas